Charles Simmons (24 December 1885 – 15 February 1945) was a British gymnast who competed in the 1912 Summer Olympics.

He was born on 24 December 1885 in Islington, London. He was part of the British team, which won the bronze medal in the gymnastics men's team, European system event in 1912. In the individual all-around competition he finished 28th.

Simmons worked as a physical training instructor. He married Winifred Ada Loveland on 23 May 1914 at St Marks Church, Tollington Park, London, and had four children, the youngest of whom was the actress Jean Simmons. He died on 15 February 1945 in London.

References

External links
 Charles Simmons' profile at databaseOlympics
 Charles Simmons' profile at Sports Reference.com

1885 births
1945 deaths
British male artistic gymnasts
Gymnasts at the 1912 Summer Olympics
Olympic bronze medallists for Great Britain
Olympic gymnasts of Great Britain
Olympic medalists in gymnastics
Medalists at the 1912 Summer Olympics